The Cut may refer to:

Media
 The Cut, a 2011 novel by American author George Pelecanos
 The Cut (website), a website by New York magazine
 The Cut (magazine), a bi-monthly New Zealand golf magazine
 The Cut (play), a 2006 theatre play by Mark Ravenhill

Television
 The Cut (1998 TV series), a 1998 MTV talent series hosted by TLC member Lisa "Left Eye" Lopes
 The Cut (2005 TV series), a television reality show for world class fashion designers
 The Cut (Australian TV series), an Australian drama television series
 The Cut (British TV series), a BBC television teen drama

Film
 The Cut (2007 film), a South Korean horror film
 The Cut (2014 drama film), an internationally co-produced drama film directed by Fatih Akın
 The Cut (2014 short film), a short film
 The Cut (2017 film), a Kenyan film directed by Peter Wangugi Gitau

Places
 The Cut (Michigan), a river in Roscommon County, Michigan
 The Cut, Berkshire, a river in England that rises in North Ascot, Berkshire
 The Cut, London, a street in London which runs between Waterloo Road in Lambeth and Blackfriars Road in Southwark
 The Cut (theatre), a theatre in the Suffolk town of Halesworth
 The Cut, an 1834 bridge built in the Northern Irish town of Banbridge
 Maryland House of Correction (also "The Cut"), a Maryland Department of Corrections state maximum security prison
 Montlake Cut (also "The Cut"), the easternmost section of the Lake Washington Ship Canal

See also
 Cut (disambiguation)